The men's 15 kilometre freestyle pursuit cross-country skiing competition at the 1992 Winter Olympics in Albertville, France, was held on Saturday 15 February at Les Saisies. This was the first time a pursuit race was held in cross-country skiing at the Winter Olympics.

Each skier started based on the results from the 10 km classical event on 13 February, skiing the entire 15 kilometre course after the first-to-finish principle. Vegard Ulvang won the 10 km classical race with 19.2 seconds to Marco Albarello of Italy. Fourth-placed in the 10 km, Bjørn Dæhlie of Norway took over the lead and won over Ulvang with 53.4 seconds.

Results
The time consists the added times for both the 10 km classical and the 15 km freestyle pursuit.

References

External links
 Final results (International Ski Federation)

Men's cross-country skiing at the 1992 Winter Olympics
Men's pursuit cross-country skiing at the Winter Olympics